Basketball was one of the six initial disciplines which was held at the 1951 Asian Games in New Delhi, India, wherein five Asian teams—Burma, India, Iran, Japan and Philippines—participated. In the matches, round-robin format was employed and on the basis of final points table top three podium places were decided. Philippines team without losing a single match topped the points table and grabbed the gold medal, their first of their basketball supremacy in the  Asian Games. (They eventually won the next three editions, until 1962.) Japanese squad finished behind it and won a silver medal, Iranian team with two wins finished third and won a bronze. Host nation India, finished fourth with only single win over Burma, which came last without winning a single match.

Medalists

Results

Final standing

References
Report of the first Asian Games held at New Delhi

External links
Results

 
Basketball
1951
1951 in Asian basketball
International basketball competitions hosted by India